Hartmut Enke (20 October 1952 – 27 December 2005) was a German musician, best known as the bass guitarist in Ash Ra Tempel.

Hartmut Enke formed his first band with Manuel Göttsching at his 15th birthday party in 1967. Three years later he was a member of Göttsching's "Steeple Chase Bluesband" which would evolve into Ash Ra Tempel.

Enke decided to quit the music business in 1973, and was not present at Ash Ra Tempel's reunion in 2000. He died in late 2005, aged 53.

Discography
Ash Ra Tempel – Ash Ra Tempel – 1971
Kosmische Musik – compilation including exclusive Ash Ra Tempel track "Gendanken" – 1972
Schwingungen – Ash Ra Tempel – 1972
Seven Up – Ash Ra Tempel with Timothy Leary – 1973
Join Inn – Ash Ra Tempel – 1973
Tarot – Walter Wegmüller – 1973
Sci-Fi Party – Cosmic Jokers – 1974

1952 births
2005 deaths
German bass guitarists
Male bass guitarists
Progressive rock bass guitarists
20th-century German musicians
20th-century bass guitarists
20th-century German male musicians
German male guitarists